The 1908 Georgia Tech Yellow Jackets football team represented the Georgia Institute of Technology during the 1908 Southern Intercollegiate Athletic Association football season. J. R. Davis was selected All-Southern. Vanderbilt coach Dan McGugin wrote, "He has one glaring fault—a tendency to tackle around the eyebrows. Otherwise he is a splendid foot ball man. He weighs two hundred pounds, is never hurt, never fumbles, bucks a line hard and furnishes excellent interference. He was the strength and stay of Tech."

Before the season
The University of Georgia attacked Tech's recruitment tactics in football. UGA alumni incited a Southern Intercollegiate Athletic Association investigation into Tech's recruitment of a player UGA had recruited as well. The Georgia Alumni claimed that Tech had created a fraudulent scholarship fund, which they used to persuade the player to attend Tech rather than UGA. The SIAA ruled in favor of Tech, but the 1908 game was canceled that season due to bad blood between the rivals.

Schedule

References

Georgia Tech
Georgia Tech Yellow Jackets football seasons
Georgia Tech Yellow Jackets football